Funstyle is the sixth album by Liz Phair, independently released on her official website on July 3, 2010. A CD version was released on October 19, 2010 on Rocket Science Records. It includes a bonus disc containing ten songs from her Girly-Sound tapes.

Background
Funstyle was Phair's first album after leaving Capitol Records. Phair posted the following message on her website:

You were never supposed to hear these songs. These songs lost me my management, my record deal and a lot of nights of sleep.Yes, I rapped one of them. I'm as surprised as you are. But here is the thing you need to know about these songs and the ones coming next: These are all me. Love them, or hate them, but don't mistake them for anything other than an entirely personal, un-tethered-from-the-machine, free for all view of the world, refracted through my own crazy lens.This is my journey. I'll keep sending you postcards.

The lyrics that appear on Phair's arm on the album cover are partial lyrics to the songs "Satisfied", "Bang! Bang!", "Miss September", and "Bollywood".

A music video was made for "And He Slayed Her", and premiered on May 21, 2012.

Reception

On the review aggregator website Metacritic, Funstyle has a score of 51 out of 100, which indicates "mixed or average reviews". Though the album's reviews were not generally positive, it was better-received than her self-titled 2003 release. 

Some reviews of the album were complimentary. AllMusic's Stephen Thomas Erlewine awarded the album 3 and a half out of 5 stars, remarking "it’s actually terribly refreshing to hear Phair so loose," and stating the album shows that Liz Phair "is on her way to once again being a compelling artist unafraid to take risks." Likewise, a review by Tiny Mix Tapes praised the album and stated: "she has crafted above all else an experience, and one that is entertaining and rewarding in ways that few records can be."

Other reviewers were far more critical of the album, however. Pitchfork awarded the album 2.6 out of 10, called it "baffling," and stated that the album was ultimately "a shrewd way to lower expectations". Notably, however, Pitchfork gave Funstyle a higher rating than either of Liz Phair's preceding two albums. The A.V. Club'''s Michaelangelo Matos was equally negative, stating that the tongue-in-cheek songs "aren't especially listenable" and "the seven straighter songs those experiments surround have just as little to recommend them."

Track listing
 Funstyle (CD version)

 Funstyle (digital download version)Girlysound''

Personnel
 Liz Phair – vocals, guitars, bass guitar, keyboards
 Dave Matthews – guitar

References

External links
 

2010 albums
Liz Phair albums
Albums recorded at Robert Lang Studios
Self-released albums
Experimental rock albums by American artists